Damin ( in the practical orthography of Lardil) was a ceremonial language register used by the advanced initiated men of the aboriginal Lardil ( in the practical orthography) and Yangkaal peoples of northern Australia. Both inhabit islands in the Gulf of Carpentaria, the Lardil on Mornington Island, the largest island of the Wesley Group, and the Yangkaal on the Forsyth Islands. Their languages belong to the same family, the Tangkic languages. Lardil is the most divergent of the Tangkic languages, while the others are mutually comprehensible with Yangkaal.

The Lardil word  can be translated as being silent.

History

Origin
The origin of Damin is unclear. The Lardil and the Yangkaal say that Damin was created by a mythological figure in Dreamtime. Hale and colleagues believe that it was invented by Lardil elders; it has several aspects found in language games around the world, such as turning nasal occlusives such as m and n into nasal clicks, doubling consonants, and the like. Evans and colleagues, after studying the mythology of both tribes, speculate that it was the Yangkaal elders who invented Damin and passed it to the Lardil. According to Fleming (2017), "the eccentric features of Damin developed in an emergent and unplanned manner in which conventionalized paralinguistic phonations became semanticized as they were linked up with a signed language employed by first-order male initiates".

Past ceremonial use

The Lardil had two initiation ceremonies for men, namely luruku, which involved circumcision, and warama, which involved penile subincision. There were no ceremonies for women, although women did play an important role in these ceremonies, especially in the luruku ceremony.

It is sometimes said that Damin was a secret language, but this is misleading since there was no attempt to prevent the uninitiated members of the Leerdil tribe from overhearing it. However it was taught during the warama ceremony and, therefore, in isolation from the uninitiated. At least one elder is known, who, though not having been subincised, had an excellent command of Damin, but this seems to have been a unique case.

Damin lexical words were organised into semantic fields and shouted out to the initiate in a single session. As each word was announced, a second speaker gave its Lardil equivalent. However, it normally took several sessions before a novice mastered the basics and could use Damin openly in the community. One speaker did claim to have learned to speak Damin in a single session, but on the other hand two senior warama men admitted that they lacked a firm command of the register.

Once Damin had been learned, the speakers were known as Demiinkurlda ("Damin possessors"). They spoke the register particularly in ritual contexts, but also in everyday secular life, when foraging, sitting about gossiping, and the like.

Decline
The cultural traditions of the Lardil and Yangkaal have been in decline for several decades, and the Lardil and Yangkaal languages are nearly extinct. The last warama ceremony was held in the 1950s, so nowadays Damin is no longer in use by either the Yangkaal or the Lardil.

However, recently a revival of cultural traditions has begun, and luruku has been celebrated. It remains to be seen whether warama ceremonies will also be reactivated.

Phonology

Vowels
Damin words had three of Lardil's four pairs of vowels, ; the fourth, occurred in grammatical suffixes. Vowel length was not contrastive, but depended on the preceding consonant.

Consonants
Damin was the only click language outside Africa. Damin used only some of the (pulmonic) consonants of everyday Lardil, but they were augmented by four other airstream mechanisms: lingual ingressive (the nasal clicks), glottalic egressive (a velar ejective), pulmonic ingressive (an indrawn lateral fricative), and lingual egressive (a bilabial 'spurt'). Even some of the pulmonic egressive consonants are exotic for the Australian context: fricatives, voiceless nasals, and bilabial trills. The consonants of Damin, in the practical orthography and IPA equivalents, were:

§ These sounds are found in standard Lardil, but not in Damin, apart from grammatical words and suffixes.

L* is described as "ingressive with egressive glottalic release".

There is no alveolar–retroflex distinction in Damin, with the possible exception of the clicks.

Some of the consonants listed above only occur in clusters.  only occurs as a coda. A derivational rule seems to be to pronounce all onset nasals as clicks; it is likely that  is not a click because a velar click in the straightforward sense is not possible.

Phonotactics
Damin consonant clusters at the beginning of a word are p'ny , p'ng , fny , fng , fy , prpry , thrr . Words in normal Lardil may not begin with a cluster. However, Lardil has several clusters in the middle of words, and many of these are not found in Damin words, as Damin only allows n  and rr  in a syllable coda. The attested stem
medial Damin clusters are rrd, rrth, rrk, rrb, jb, though j of jb is supposedly not allowed in that position. Other clusters, such as nasal–stop, are produced by Lardil grammatical suffixes.

Hale & Nash posit that Damin syllables (not counting codas) may only be CVV or CCV. (Note that transcription of vowel length is inconsistent, and the vocabulary given above does not follow these patterns.)

No consonant occurs before all three vowels. Known sequences are as follows. Note however that with only 150 roots in Damin, and several consonants and consonant clusters attested from only a single root, there are certain to be accidental gaps in this list.
{| class=wikitable
|-
|Precede  only|| p'ng , p'ny , pr2y , fng , fy , thrr , j2 , k' , nh!2 
|-
|Precede  only|| fny , l* , ng* 
|-
|Precede  only|| d , rr , y , m! 
|-
|Precede  only(not clear if consonant is C or CC)|| f , pf 
|-
|Precede || n!2 
|-
|Precede || k , ng , n! 
|-
|Precede || b , th , j , w 
|-
|Precede ||rn! 
|}

Morphology and lexicon
Damin had a much more restricted and generic lexicon than everyday language. With only about 150 lexical roots, each word in Damin stood for several words of Lardil or Yangkaal. It had only two pronouns ( "me" (ego) and  "not me" (alter)), for example, compared to Lardil's nineteen, and had an antonymic prefix  ( "small",  "large").

Grammatically, the Damin registers of the Lardil and Yangkaal use all the grammatical morphology of those languages, and so therefore are broadly similar, though it does not employ the phonologically conditioned alternations of that morphology.

Damin is spoken by replacing the lexical roots of ordinary Lardil with Damin words. Apart from a leveling of grammatical allomorphs, the grammar remains the same.

Some vocabulary:
 'ego',  'alter'
 'now',  'not now'
 'bony fish',  'elasmobranch'
 'human',  'animal',  'wood' (incl. woody plants),  'stone'
 'vegetable food',  'meat/food',  'liquid',  'sea mammal',  'land mammal'
 'harm (affect harmfully)',  'act',  'see',  'hear, feel',  'be (in a place)',  'burn',  'spear',  'die, decay',  'fall; the cardinal directions'
 'point on body',  'surface on body',  'head',  'eye',  'hand, foot'
 'one, another; place',  'two; hither, close; short'

Antonymic derivation with :
 'small',  'large'
 'one',  'many'
 'short',  'long'
 'light',  'heavy'

Specific reference requires paraphrasing. For example, a sandpiper is called a 'person-burning creature' ( 'human burn- animal') in reference to its role as a character in the Rainbow Serpent Story, while a wooden axe is 'wood that (negatively) affects honey' ( 'honey affect- wood')

There is some suggestion of internal morphology or compounding, as suggested by the patterns in the word list above. For example,  '(native) beehive, honey' and  'sp. mud crab' may derive from  'food' and  'mud shell clam'.

Notes

References

Sources

External links
 

Tangkic languages
Extinct languages of Queensland
Constructed languages
North West Queensland
Mixed languages
Click languages
Initiation languages
Languages extinct in the 1970s